United Nations Security Council resolution 967, adopted unanimously on 14 December 1994, after recalling all resolutions on the situation in the former Yugoslavia, in particular Resolution 757 (1992) and receiving letters from the chairman of the security council committee established in Resolution 727 (1992) and the United Nations Children's Fund which noted a resurgence in diphtheria and that the only available stocks of anti-serum to combat the condition were located in Serbia and Montenegro, the council, acting under Chapter VII of the United Nations Charter, authorised the export of 12,000 vials of diphtheria anti-serum from the country for a period of 30 days.

The export required exemption from international sanctions placed on the Federal Republic of Yugoslavia, and the council decided that any payments for the authorised shipments must only be made into frozen accounts.

See also
 Bosnian War
 Breakup of Yugoslavia
 Croatian War of Independence
 List of United Nations Security Council Resolutions 901 to 1000 (1994–1995)
 Yugoslav Wars

References

External links
 
Text of the Resolution at undocs.org

 0967
 0967
1994 in Yugoslavia
 0967
December 1994 events